Punal may refer to :

 Punal Nadu, one of the minor Tamil kingdoms
 Puñal